Malombo (also Molombo) is a village in the commune of Nyambaka in the Adamawa Region of Cameroon.

Population 
At the time of the 2005 census, there were 839 people in the village.

References

Bibliography 
 Jean Boutrais (ed.), Peuples et cultures de l'Adamaoua (Cameroun) : actes du colloque de Ngaoundéré, du 14 au 16 janvier 1992, ORSTOM, Paris ; Ngaoundéré-Anthropos, 1993, 316 p. 
 Dictionnaire des villages de l'Adamaoua, ONAREST, Yaoundé, October 1974, 133 p.

External links 
 Nyambaka, sur le site Communes et villes unies du Cameroun (CVUC)

Populated places in Adamawa Region